Veronica Decides to Die may refer to:

 Veronika Decides to Die, a novel by Paolo Coelho
 Veronika Decides to Die (film), a 2009 film directed by Emily Young
 Veronika Decides to Die (album), a 2006 album by Saturnus